Nawfal ibn Abd al-Manaf was the son of Abd Manaf ibn Qusai, and the progenitor of the Banu Nawfal of the Quraysh, including Mut'im ibn 'Adi ibn Nawfal.

Family tree

See also
Nawfal (name)
Abd-al-Manaf (name)

References 

Sahabah ancestors
510s deaths
Year of birth unknown
6th-century Arabs